The 2020 French Indoor Athletics Championships was the 49th edition of the national championship in indoor track and field for France, organised by the French Athletics Federation. It was held on 29 February – 1 March at the Arena Stade Couvert de Liévin in Liévin. A total of 28 events (divided evenly between the sexes) were contested over the two-day competition. It was to serve as preparation for the 2020 World Athletics Indoor Championships, which was postponed due to the COVID-19 outbreak in China before the French championships.

Results

Men

Women

References

Results
 Results. French Athletics Federation  

French Indoor Athletics Championships
French Indoor Athletics Championships
French Indoor Athletics Championships
French Indoor Athletics Championships
Sport in Pas-de-Calais